Otakar Votík was a Czech rower. He competed at the 1920 Summer Olympics in Antwerp with the men's eight where they were eliminated in round one.

References

Year of birth missing
Year of death missing
Czechoslovak male rowers
Olympic rowers of Czechoslovakia
Rowers at the 1920 Summer Olympics
European Rowing Championships medalists